St. Thomas Aquinas Regional Secondary is a Catholic school, under the administration of CISVA (Catholic Independent Schools of the Vancouver Archdiocese) school board.

The school is co-educational, offering academic, fine arts, and business programs, as well as athletic, performing arts, and other extracurricular programs, for students from grades 8 to 12.

The  school participates  in sporting events under the name of the "Fighting Saints".

History 
The Sisters of the Child Jesus arrived in British Columbia in 1898 to do missionary work with the First Nations people of the North Shore and built St. Paul’s Indian Residential School. A variety of issues were reported over the years, including reports that the building was a "death-trap" and a "fire trap". The Truth And Reconciliation Commission spoke of rampant sexual, physical and emotional abuse towards the students. 

Today there is a memorial statue for all of the students that attended St. Paul's Indian Residential School.
In 1957, Archbishop William Mark Duke (also known as Iron Duke) approached the sisters to establish a high school on the North Shore. By 1959 the first students walked through the doors of St. Thomas Aquinas.

Independent School Status 

St. Thomas Aquinas Regional Secondary is classified as a Group 1 school under British Columbia's Independent School Act. It receives 50% funding from the Ministry of Education. The school receives no funding for capital costs. It is under charge of the Roman Catholic Archdiocese of Vancouver.

Academic performance 

St. Thomas Aquinas Regional Secondary is ranked by the Fraser Institute. In 2007, it was ranked 16th out of 298 Vancouver, lower mainland schools.

99% of the students graduate and 75% of graduates enroll at post-secondary institutions immediately after graduation.

Provincial exam averages exceeds provincial norms and are higher than CISVA & Independent school averages.

Athletic performance 

Both the varsity boys' and girls' basketball teams participate in the BC Catholic Basketball Championship, one of the largest tournaments in  British Columbia.

Girls volleyball
2009/10 - B.C. Senior Provincial Champions
2009/10 - B.C. Catholic Champions
2009/10 - Lower Mainland 'AA' Champions
2009/10 - B.C. Junior Catholic Champions
2009/10 - Junior Girls Vancouver & District Champions
2009/10 - Juvenile Girls Vancouver & District Champions
Ten time Top 10 finish 'AA" Provincial Championships
Eight Time B.C. Catholic Champions
Seven Time Juvenile Girls Vancouver & District Champions
Ten Time Bantam Girls Vancouver & District Champions

Boys soccer
2008/09 - 10th Place 'AA' Provincial Championships
Three Time 'A' Provincial Champions (1998, 2001, 2002)
2001/02 - Jr. Boys Vancouver Independent Schools Champions

Wrestling
2007/08 - 2nd Place Girls Vancouver & District
2007/08 - 2nd Place Jr. Boys & Girls North Shore Finals
2007/08 - Okangan Invitational Boys & Girls Champions
2005/06 - 5th Place 'AAA' Provincial Championships
2004/05 - 2nd Place 'AA' Provincial Championships
2003/04 - 2nd Place 'AA' Provincial Championships

Boys basketball
Four Time 'A' Provincial Champions (1992, 1993, 1994, 2003)
1999/2000 - 'AA' Provincial Champions
Four Time B.C. Catholic Champions
Three Time Bantam Boys Vancouver & District Champions

Girls basketball
2007/08 - North Shore Division One Champions
2002, 2003, 2004 North Shore 'AA' Champions
1994/95 - BC Catholic Champions

Track and field
2004/05 - North Shore Overall Aggregate Champions
2004/05 - Junior Boys Vancouver & District Champions
2002/03 - North Shore Overall Aggregate Champions
2001/02 - Vancouver & District Champions

Golf
2005/06 - 7th Place 'AA' Provincial Championships
2003/04 - Lower Mainland 'AA' Champions

Artistic performance 

St. Thomas Aquinas Regional Secondary provides students with a variety of performing and non-performing arts.

Notable alumni
Mike Bernier - Politician
Noel Callahan - Actor
David Coles - Musician

See also
 St. Paul’s Indian Residential School

References

External links 
St. Thomas Aquinas Regional Secondary School
Catholic Independent Schools of the Vancouver Archdiocese

Catholic secondary schools in British Columbia
Private schools in British Columbia
High schools in British Columbia
Educational institutions established in 1959
1959 establishments in British Columbia